The 2008 African Women's Handball Championship was the 18th edition of the African Women's Handball Championship, held in Angola from 8 to 17 January 2008. It acted as the African qualifying tournament for the 2009 World Women's Handball Championship and the 2008 Summer Olympics.

Preliminary round
All times are local (UTC+1).

Group A

Group B

Knockout stage

Bracket

5–8th place bracket

5–8th place semifinals

Semifinals

Seventh place game

Fifth place game

Third place game

Final

Final ranking
Angola qualified also for the 2008 Summer Olympics and the Ivory Coast and Congo participated at a 2008 Summer Olympics qualification tournament.

Awards
Most Valuable Player:
Top scorer:, 39 goals

All-star team

External links
Results on todor66.com

2008 Women
African Women's Handball Championship
African Women's Handball Championship
African Women's Handball Championship
Women's Handball Championship
African Women's Handball Championship
Women's handball in Angola
African Handball Championship